The Wrong Bottle is a 1913 American drama film featuring Harry Carey.

Cast
 Claire McDowell as The Blind Sister
 Charles Hill Mailes as The Devoted One
 Pearl Sindelar as The Younger Sister
 Charles West as The Faithless Lover
 Hector Dion as The Faithful Lover
 Lionel Barrymore as The Father
 Clara T. Bracy as A Neighbor
 Harry Carey as Extra
 Walter Miller as In Road House
 W. C. Robinson as In Road House

See also
 Harry Carey filmography
 Lionel Barrymore filmography

External links

1913 films
American silent short films
American black-and-white films
1913 drama films
1913 short films
Films directed by Anthony O'Sullivan
Silent American drama films
1910s American films